NGC 340 is a spiral galaxy in the constellation Cetus. It was discovered on September 27, 1864, by Albert Marth. It was described by Dreyer as "very faint, small, extended."

References

External links
 

0340
-01-03-055
003610
18640927
Cetus (constellation)
Spiral galaxies